Don Jacobo José María Fitz-James Stuart y Silva, 6th Duke of Berwick, 6th Duke of Liria, 6th Duke of Jérica, Grandee of Spain (3 January 1792 – 5 January 1795) was the second surviving son of the 5th Duke of Berwick, briefly inheriting his titles. He died at age three and two days and passed them onto his younger brother Carlos Miguel Fitz-James Stuart.

1792 births
1795 deaths
Berwick, Jacobo Fitz-James Stuart, 6th Duke of
Dukes of Spain
Grandees of Spain

Royalty and nobility who died as children